Joseph Blomfield (1 March 1870 - 9 November 1948), was a British anaesthetist who was on the list of honorary staff at King Edward VII for Officers. He was editor of the British Journal of Anaesthesia.

References 

1870 births
1948 deaths
Presidents of the Association of Anaesthetists